The 2011 Major League Soccer season was the 99th season of FIFA-sanctioned soccer, the 33rd with a national first-division league, in the United States and Canada, and the 16th season of Major League Soccer. The season marked the arrival of two new league clubs, Portland Timbers and Vancouver Whitecaps FC, whose cities previously had clubs of similar name play in the USSF D2 Pro League. Those two new West Coast clubs led to a realignment of the league's conferences, with Houston Dynamo moving to the Eastern Conference to create two conferences of nine teams each.

Each team played a balanced 34-match regular season schedule, playing every team twice (once at home and once away).  The regular season began on March 15, when the Los Angeles Galaxy defeated the Seattle Sounders FC 1–0 at Qwest Field, and concluded with the host Houston Dynamo defeating the Los Angeles Galaxy 3–1 on October 23 at Robertson Stadium.  The season also featured the 2011 MLS All-Star Game on July 27, when Manchester United defeated the MLS All-Stars 4–0 at Red Bull Arena (hosted by the New York Red Bulls).  The 2011 MLS Cup Playoffs ran from October 26 until November 20, when the Los Angeles Galaxy claimed their third MLS championship by defeating Houston Dynamo 1–0 in MLS Cup 2011 at Home Depot Center in Carson, California.

Changes from 2010
A number of structural changes were made prior to this season, involving both on- and off-the field aspects of the league.

Structural changes 
To accommodate the arrival of the two new franchises, the league expanded the number of regular season matches to 34 total games.

The MLS Cup Playoffs expanded from eight teams to ten. Beginning with this season, the best three teams from each conference receive guaranteed playoff spots; the four teams with the next best point totals will play one-match knockout games to determine the final participant for each conference. With the new playoff structure, comes a new incentive for the MLS Supporters Shield winner, who will play the lowest seeded team to qualify for the conference semifinals.

Furthermore, the MLS Reserve Division returned; the rosters accordingly expanded to 30 players. Other minor changes included the shortening of the MLS SuperDraft from four rounds, down to three, and the expansion of the number of guaranteed spots reserved for away supporters from 150 to 500.

Roster rule changes 
Team rosters were expanded to 30 players in order to accommodate the re-introduction of the MLS Reserve Division. Of these 30 players, 18–20 count against a club's salary cap of $2,675,000. Clubs may still have a maximum of three Designated Players per club, each of whom counts $335,000 for salary cap purposes. The transfer windows for acquisition of players under contract in another country run from January 21 – April 15 and from July 15 – August 14.

Other key roster rule changes were the introduction of Off-Budget players who do not count against a club's salary cap; the ability of clubs to forgo fielding a full roster of 30 players for salary reasons; the introduction of roster slots paid below last year's league minimum; the ability of the two Canadian clubs to count U.S. domestic players as domestic players for roster purposes; and the ability of clubs to buy out one guaranteed player contract during the off-season and free up the corresponding budget space.

Managerial changes

Teams 
Two new expansion clubs entered the league: Portland Timbers and Vancouver Whitecaps FC. These clubs, alluding to their history, are the immediate successors to clubs that played in the USSF D2 Pro League in 2010, and before that the USL First Division. Both clubs also bear the names of members of the original North American Soccer League.

Further, the Kansas City Wizards rebranded as Sporting Kansas City and moved into their new stadium at Livestrong Sporting Park in Kansas City, Kansas.

Finally, with the arrival of two West Coast clubs, the Houston Dynamo transferred to the Eastern Conference.

Stadiums and locations 

Notes
1Vancouver Whitecaps played home matches at Empire Field prior to moving into the newly renovated BC Place on October 2, 2011.

Personnel and sponsoring 
Both of the new teams to MLS received jersey sponsors, while several existing teams saw changes in jersey sponsorships for the 2011 season.
Alaska Airlines signed on as the first MLS shirt sponsor for the Portland Timbers.
Bell Canada became the first shirt sponsor for Vancouver Whitecaps FC in its MLS incarnation.
Glidden declined to renew its jersey sponsorship of the Columbus Crew, which has not yet found a replacement.
Greenstar are the new shirt sponsor for the Houston Dynamo, replacing Amigo Energy.
Bimbo will serve as the first ever shirt sponsor for the Philadelphia Union.
Chivas USA continue to be sponsored by Grupo Modelo, but this sponsorship is now through its Corona beer brand, as opposed to the Extra convenience store brand as used in 2010.
UnitedHealthcare became the first ever kit sponsor for New England Revolution.

Note: Flags indicate national team as has been defined under FIFA eligibility rules. Players and managers may hold one or more non-FIFA nationalities.

League standings

Overall table

Conference standings

Eastern Conference

Western Conference

Tiebreakers
 Head-to-Head (Points-per-match average)
 Overall Goal Differential
 Overall Total Goals Scored
 Tiebreakers 1–3 applied only to matches on the road
 Tiebreakers 1–3 applied only to matches at home
 Fewest team disciplinary points in the League Fair Play table
 Coin toss

If more than two clubs are tied, once a club advances through any step, the process reverts to Tiebreaker 1 among the remaining tied clubs recursively until all ties are resolved.

Results
For the second year in a row, the league uses a balanced schedule. Each team will play every other team twice, home and away, for a total of 34 games.

Playoff bracket

Statistical leaders
Full article: MLS Golden Boot

Top scorers

Last updated on October 23, 2011. Source: MLSsoccer.com statistics – Goals

Most assists

Last updated on October 23, 2011. Source: MLSsoccer.com statistics – Assists

|}

Top goalkeepers
(Minimum of 1,000 minutes played)

Last updated on October 23, 2011. Source: MLSsoccer.com statistics – Goalkeeping

Individual awards

Annual awards

Monthly awards

Weekly awards

Transfers 

Major League Soccer employs no fewer than 12 methods to acquire players. These include: signing players on transfers/free transfers as is done in most of the world; via trades; drafting players through mechanisms such as the MLS SuperDraft, MLS Supplemental Draft, or MLS Re-Entry Draft; rarely used methods which cover extreme hardship and injury replacement; signing players as Designated Players or Homegrown Players; placing a discovery claim on players; waivers; and methods peculiar to MLS such as through allocation or a weighted lottery.

Allocation ranking 
The allocation ranking is the mechanism used to determine which MLS club has first priority to acquire a U.S. National Team player who signs with MLS after playing abroad, or a former MLS player who returns to the League after having gone to a club abroad for a transfer fee. The allocation rankings may also be used in the event two or more clubs file a request for the same player on the same day. The allocations will be ranked in reverse order of finish for the 2010 season, taking playoff performance into account.

Once the club uses its allocation ranking to acquire a player, it drops to the bottom of the list. A ranking can be traded, provided that part of the compensation received in return is another club's ranking. At all times, each club is assigned one ranking. The rankings reset at the end of each MLS League season.

¤ Davies was signed by United on a twelve-month loan deal. 
¤¤ Chicago originally had the No. 9 ranking but traded it to Seattle on August 26, 2011.

The remaining order after Sporting Kansas City is: Chicago Fire¤¤, Columbus Crew, New York Red Bulls, Real Salt Lake, San Jose Earthquakes, Los Angeles Galaxy, FC Dallas, and Colorado Rapids. In the unlikely event that all clubs use an allocation, the order begins anew with Vancouver Whitecaps FC.

Weighted lottery 
Some players are assigned to MLS teams via a weighted lottery process. A team can only acquire one player per year through a weighted lottery. The players made available through lotteries include: (i) Generation adidas players signed after the MLS SuperDraft; and (ii) Draft eligible players to whom an MLS contract was offered but who failed to sign with the League prior to the SuperDraft.

The team with the worst record over its last 30 regular season games (dating back to previous season if necessary and taking playoff performance into account) will have the greatest probability of winning the lottery. Teams are not required to participate in a lottery. Players are assigned via the lottery system in order to prevent a player from potentially influencing his destination club with a strategic holdout.

The results of 2011 weighted lotteries:

Related competitions

International competitions

CONCACAF Champions League

Prior to the start of the MLS regular season, Columbus Crew and Real Salt Lake played against each other in the quarterfinals of 2010–11 edition of the CONCACAF Champions League. The first leg, contested at Crew Stadium on February 22, 2011; ended in a scoreless draw between the sides. On March 1, 2011; the second leg at Rio Tinto Stadium was played, where Real Salt Lake won the series against the Crew 4–1 in the game and on aggregate, this ending Columbus' Champions League campaign.

As a result, Salt Lake became the first MLS team to advance into the semifinals of the Champions League under its current format. The team won its home fixture against Saprissa of Costa Rica 2–0 on March 15, 2011. Real Salt Lake lost the away fixture 2–1 on April 5, 2011, but advanced 3–2 on aggregate. They faced Monterrey of Mexico in the first leg of the final on April 20 in Monterrey. The game concluded in a 2–2 draw. The second leg was played at Rio Tinto on April 27, 2011. Monterrey won 1–0 (3–2 on aggregate) with a late goal in the first half.

Colorado Rapids and Los Angeles Galaxy have qualified directly into Group Stage for the 2011–12 edition of the Champions League by being the MLS Cup and Supporters' Shield winners, respectively. Both Seattle Sounders FC and FC Dallas have earned preliminary entries in the tournament by winning the U.S. Open Cup and finishing runner up in the MLS Cup, respectively. Toronto FC secured the Canadian berth in the preliminary round with their Voyageurs Cup victory on July 2.

World Football Challenge

On March 29, 2011 MLS Commissioner Don Garber confirmed that the 2011 edition of the North American SuperLiga would be replaced by the World Football Challenge, a friendly tournament which started play on July 14 and will end on August 6.

The following MLS sides entered the tournament based on invitation: Los Angeles Galaxy, Philadelphia Union, New England Revolution, Chicago Fire and Vancouver Whitecaps FC.

Domestic competitions

Lamar Hunt U.S. Open Cup

The MLS clubs that finished first through sixth place overall during last year's regular season earned a direct bye to the third round proper of the U.S. Open Cup. Clubs that finished seventh or lower will have to play for the final two spots in a series of play-in propers, based on their geographic location as well as their final regular season position.

Canadian championship

The two Canadian-based MLS clubs, Toronto FC and Vancouver Whitecaps FC participated in the Canadian Championship, Canada's domestic soccer cup. They competed against two other professional Canadian soccer teams from the NASL for the Voyageurs Cup, as well as a Preliminary Round berth in the CONCACAF Champions League. The tournament is organized in a knockout format with two-legged ties in both the semifinals and final, with the away goals rule in place.

The two began in the semifinal round, where the Whitecaps defeated the Montreal Impact and Toronto defeated FC Edmonton. The first leg of the final, held in Vancouver on May 18, ended in a 1–1 draw. The second leg, on May 25 in Toronto, was abandoned due to torrential rains with the Whitecaps leading 1–0. Under competition rules, the second leg was to be replayed in its entirety the following day, but the field remained unplayable. The second leg was replayed, again in its entirety, on July 2, with Toronto winning the game 2–1 and the championship 3–2 on aggregate.

League competitions

MLS Cup

Following the 2011 season, ten MLS clubs will qualify for the MLS Cup Playoffs postseason tournament. Of the ten clubs, six will be automatic qualifiers from the top three clubs in each conference. These automatic qualifiers earn a bye to the conference semifinal, or quarterfinal round proper. Four more qualifiers will enter in a play-in round, where these for clubs will be determined by their final regular season standing, regardless of their conference. The winners of the play-in games will play in the conference semifinals, where the lowest seeded club will play against the Supporters' Shield winners.

The cup final will be held on a neutral venue.

Cups and Rivalries

This season marks the first time that the Cascadia Cup will be contested in Major League Soccer. Seattle, Portland and Vancouver contested this cup from 2004–08 until Seattle joined Major League Soccer. The competition continued between Portland and Vancouver for the next two years.

Coaches

Eastern Conference
Chicago Fire: Carlos de los Cobos
Columbus Crew: Robert Warzycha
D.C. United: Ben Olsen
Kansas City Wizards: Peter Vermes
New England Revolution: Steve Nicol
New York Red Bulls: Hans Backe
Philadelphia Union: Peter Nowak
Toronto FC: Nick Dasovic

Western Conference
Chivas USA: Martín Vásquez
Colorado Rapids: Gary Smith
FC Dallas: Schellas Hyndman
Houston Dynamo: Dominic Kinnear
Los Angeles Galaxy: Bruce Arena
Portland Timbers: John Spencer
Real Salt Lake: Jason Kreis
San Jose Earthquakes: Frank Yallop
Seattle Sounders FC: Sigi Schmid
Vancouver Whitecaps FC: Tom Soehn

References

 
2011
1
2012–13 CONCACAF Champions League